Year 1259 (MCCLIX) was a common year starting on Wednesday (link will display the full calendar) of the Julian calendar.

Events 
 By place 
 Europe 
 September – Battle of Pelagonia: The Empire of Nicaea defeats the Principality of Achaea, ensuring the eventual reconquest of Constantinople in 1261.
 December 4 – Kings Louis IX of France and Henry III of England agree to the Treaty of Paris, in which Henry renounces his claims to French-controlled territory on continental Europe (including Normandy), in exchange for Louis withdrawing his support for English rebels.
 The famous frescoes of the Boyana Church in Bulgaria are completed (the church and its murals are now a UNESCO World Heritage Site).
 The German cities of Lübeck, Wismar, and Rostock enter into a pact to defend against pirates of the Baltic Sea, laying the groundwork for the Hanseatic League.
 Nogai Khan leads the second Mongol Golden Horde attack against Lithuania, and Poland.
 Epirote–Nicaean conflict.

 Asia 
 August 11 – While conducting a siege against the Song Dynasty city known as Fishing Town in the province of Chongqing, China, the Mongol Great Khan, Möngke Khan, dies in the nearby hills. Persian, Chinese, and Mongol records have different accounts of how he died, including succumbing to an arrow wound received by a Chinese archer in the siege, dysentery, and even a cholera epidemic. His death sparks a succession crisis in the Mongol Empire, while his brothers Ariq Böke and Kublai soon convene their own kurultai to elect themselves as the next Khan of Khans, opening the path to a four–year-long Toluid Civil War from 1260 to 1264. In the end, Ariq Böke surrenders to Kublai.
 While engaged in a war with the Mongols, the Song Chinese official Li Zengbo writes in his Kozhai Zagao, Xugaohou that the city of Qingzhou is manufacturing one to two thousand strong iron-cased gunpowder bomb shells a month, dispatching to Xiangyang and Yingzhou about ten to twenty thousand such bombs at a time.
 Lannathai, a kingdom in the north of Thailand, is founded by King Mangrai.
 The Goryeo Kingdom in Korea surrenders to invading Mongol forces.
 The Chinese era Kaiqing begins and ends, in the Northern Song Dynasty of China.
 The Japanese Shōka era ends, and the Shōgen era begins.

Births 
 February 25 – Infanta Branca of Portugal, daughter of King Afonso III of Portugal and Urraca of Castile (d. 1321)
 March 25 – Andronikos II Palaiologos, Byzantine emperor (d. 1332)
 Pietro Cavallini, Italian painter (d. 1330)
 Demetre II of Georgia (d. 1289)
 Richard Óg de Burgh, 2nd Earl of Ulster (d. 1326)

Deaths 
 January – Matilda II, Countess of Boulogne, ruler of Boulogne, queen consort of Portugal (b. 1202)
 February 7 – Thomas, Count of Flanders
 May 29 – King Christopher I of Denmark (b. 1219)
 July 21 – Gojong of Goryeo
 August 11 – Möngke Khan of the Mongol Empire
 October 7 – Ezzelino III da Romano, Italian ruler
 November 18 – Adam Marsh, English scholar and theologian
 date unknown – Matthew Paris, English chronicler

References